Mary Euginia Ghann is a Ghanaian politician and a member of the first Parliament of the fourth Republic representing the 
New Edubease constituency in the Ashanti region of Ghana. She represented the National Democratic Congress.

Early life and education
Ghann was born at New Edubease in the Ashanti Region of Ghana.

Politics
Ghann was elected into parliament on the ticket of the National Democratic Congress (NDC) to represent the New Edubease Constituency in the Ashanti Region of Ghana during the 1992 Ghanaian parliamentary election. She polled 7,939 votes out of the 100% valid votes cast. Following her death in September 1993, she was replaced by Theresa Joyce Baffoe who won the consequent by-election on the ticket of the NDC, she was sworn into office as a member  of parliament for the New Edubiase constituency on 6 October 1993.

Death
Ghann died in September 1993.

References

1994 deaths
National Democratic Congress (Ghana) politicians
People from Ashanti Region
Ghanaian MPs 1993–1997
21st-century Ghanaian politicians